Fabio Nebuloni (born 28 February 1969) is an Italian modern pentathlete. He competed in the men's individual event at the 1996 Summer Olympics.

References

External links
 

1969 births
Living people
Italian male modern pentathletes
Olympic modern pentathletes of Italy
Modern pentathletes at the 1996 Summer Olympics
People from Busto Arsizio
Sportspeople from the Province of Varese
20th-century Italian people